Alexandria Haber is a Canadian playwright and actor. Her plays include Life Here After (winner of the 2009 write-on-Q playwriting competition), I Don’t like Mondays, Four Minutes if You Bleed, Housekeeping & Homewrecking, Ordinary Times, Birthmarks, A Christmas Carol, and Tom Waits. She has written radio plays for CBC Radio including The Very Little Girl (winner of the CBC Radio New Voices Competition) and Washing Day (winner of the CBC Radio Sound FX contest).

Biography 
Haber was born in Hamilton, Ontario and moved to Montreal, Quebec at age five. She studied Theatre Performance at Concordia University.

Selected works

Plays 
 Alice and The World We Live In (Second place winner, Write on Q! Playwriting Competition 2016)
 Water Wars
 Mouth to Mouth 
 It’s a Wonderful Life
 On This Day
 Game Changers
 Closed for Urgent and Extraordinary Work
 Cross My Heart
 Tom Waits
 Life Here After (Winner of the 2009 Infinite Theatre's Write-on- Q! Playwriting Competition)
 I Don’t Like Mondays
 A Christmas Carol (adapted from the novel by Charles Dickens)
 Housekeeping & Homewrecking (MECCA winner for Best Ensemble Production 2007)
 Ordinary Times
 Dying To See You Again
 The Full Molly (Short listed for the Just for Laughs Best Comedy)
 Housekeeping (Monologue)
 The Farm
 Birthmarks

Radio plays 
 A Grown Girl's Guide to Gladness (CBC Radio)
 The Very Little Girl (CBC Radio)
 Washing Day (CBC Radio)

Short stories 
 Loved 
 New Year's Day
 Housekeeping

Filmography 
 19-2 (TV series, 2 episodes)
 Jackie Bouvier Kennedy Onassis (TV mini series)
 Silent Trigger

References 

Living people
Actresses from Hamilton, Ontario
Canadian television actresses
Concordia University alumni
Canadian women dramatists and playwrights
Actresses from Montreal
Year of birth missing (living people)